Louise Welter (1897-1999) was a Luxembourgian physician. 

She became the first female physician in Luxembourg in 1923.

References

1897 births
1999 deaths
Luxembourgian physicians
Date of birth missing
Date of death missing
Place of birth missing